Kukudakhandi popularly known as KKD is one of the significant villages in the Kukudakhandi Tehsil of Ganjam district in the Indian State of Odisha. The village is 31.2 km from its district main sub-division Chatrapur and is 149 km from its State capital Bhubaneswar. KKD is more often considered as a part of the city Berhampur

Villages near KKD include Ramachandrapur (Baunsiapalli 1.2 km), Masiakhali (3.2 km), Dayapalli (3.7 km), Saradhapur (4 km),  Badakhandi (4.3 km), and Dakhinapur (5.6 km).  Nearest Towns are Kukudakhandi (0 km), Hinjilicut (10.2 km), Sanakhemundi (12.7 km), Rangeilunda (16.6 km).

Economy
As Kukudakhandi is well connected to nearby Berhampur, many people rush to the city to get their daily rotis & butter as the city is seized with opportunities. Most of the people in KKD are government employees, and some are involved in agricultural activities. Agriculture is the mainstay of economy. The farmers no longer limit their agricultural activities but strive to get profit out of their labor.

Industry
The emergence of industrial kukudakhandi began in the late twentieth century, with granite industries arriving. Kukudakhandi's proximity to Berhampur, good climate, and availability of talent made it a destination for good firms.

Culture
Kukudakhandi is a predominantly Hindu region. A great exchange of wishes in the occasions like Ganesh Puja. Diwali, Dushera, Makar Sankranti, & Christmas are very special to see in the village.  About 99% people are Hindus. So regional festivals like Jhami yatra, Danda Yatra & Meru, Rath Yatra (Sri Jagannath Yatra) are very special to see.

Temples & Festivals
Kukudakhandi is a hub of temples. A number of temples are present in the village of which Mukteswar Temple is very prominent. The brightening  of those temples often occurs in the festivals like Ganesh Puja, Maha Shivratri, Diwali and the decorated stalls during Dushera.

Thakurani Yatra
10-day-long the festival of kukudakhandi Thakurani, popularly known as 'Thakurani Yatra' comes once in every five year. Initially the famous Thakurani yatra was started in Berhampur. According to some eminent historians, the cult of Buddhi Thakurani originated along with the emergence of Berhampur town in and around 1672 AD. Telugu Lengayat Dera (weaver) community, who came to Mahuri on the invitation of Raja Saheb of Mahuri to take up their profession of weaving, started their ‘Ghata Yatra’ (Pot Festival) for highlighting the divinity of Mahamayee Thakurani of his capital town Berhampur. The Chief of the Dera community, Kota Chandramani Kubera Senapati, led his community people to migrate to Mahuri and Berhampur who settle down into their hereditary profession of weaving tussar silken products or ‘patta matha’.  The ‘Ghata Yatra’ was initiated for the purpose of highlighting the tradition of worshiping Thakurani. This later considered as Thakurani Yatra. Now this festival is not only celebrated in Berhampur but also in different parts across the district of Ganjam. Apart from Berhampur, people of  Kukudakhandi, Boirani(Kabisurya Nagar), BhanjaNagar, Asika, Chhatrapur also celebrate this festival as Thakurani Yatra.

Visitor attractions
Some of the prominent places to visit near the village are;
 Gopalpur-on-sea
 Silk city Berhampur
 Tara Tarini Temple
 Mahuri Kalua
 IRE Port
 Sonapur beach
 Siddha Vairabi Temple

Education
Education is very prominent in Kukudakhandi. Increasing numbers of colleges, coaching centres & other educational institutions have extended the quality of education and this may possibly be the reason of why more individuals are working with MNCs in big cities as well as in foreign countries.

Schools in Kukudakhandi
 Girls Upper Primary(U.P) School
 Main Road U.P School
 Rathachakada Sahi U.P school
 Block School
 Indira Awas U.P School.
 M.E School
 Residential School
 Saraswati Sisu Mandir
 Govt High School
 Biju Patnaik Girls High School

Other prominent Schools nearby kukudakhandi
 Maa Aravind School
 Takshashila Residential School

Colleges in Kukudakhandi & nearby
 Science College Kukudakhandi
 Sanjay Memorial Institute of Technology (SMIT)
 Govt. Ayurvedic College, Ankushpur

Offices in Kukudakhandi
 Tahsil Office
 RI Office
 Treasury
 BSNL Telephone Exchange
 Kukudakhandi Sub-Post office
 Govt Medical, Kukudakhandi
 Veterinary Dispensary

References

External links
 www.indiamapia.com › Ganjam
 wikimapia.org › Kukudakhandi Block

Villages in Ganjam district